This page lists the winners and nominees for the Black Reel Award for Outstanding Foreign Film. This award is presented to the director of the film and was first awarded during the 2012 ceremony.

Winners and nominees
Winners are listed first and highlighted in bold.

2010s

2020s

Tally by country

References

Black Reel Awards